This is a complete list in alphabetical order of cricketers who have played for Queensland in First-Class matches since 1892–93.

The Appendix contains names of 18 players who appeared for Queensland teams in List A or Twenty20 cricket matches, but who have not so far appeared in any first-class matches for the team.

List
Statistics included are only for matches played for Queensland
Players who hold a state contract for the 2019–21 season have their names in bold
Players who have played international cricket are highlighted in  blue

Appendix

List A/T20 players
The following cricketers have played in List A and/or Twenty20 matches for Queensland, but have not appeared in first-class cricket for the team:

 Corey Barsby (2010–11) : C. R. Barsby
 Phillip Bawden (1973-74) : P. A. Bawden 
 Michael Buchanan (2005–06 to 2007–08) : M. J. Buchanan
 Daniel Coleborn (1991–92) : D. P. Coleborn
 Andrew Gode (2018–19) : A. J. Gode
 Errol Harris (1991–92) : E. J. Harris
 Graeme Hogan (1991–92) : G. G. Hogan
 Brad Ipson (2010–11 to 2012–13) : B. K. Ipson
 Michael Lumb (2010–11) : M. J. Lumb
 Rodney Peterson (1991–92) : R. M. Peterson
 Trent Ryan (1991–92) : T. A. Ryan
 Joe Scuderi (1988–89) : J. C. Scuderi
 Michael Sippel (2001–02) : M. Sippel
 Graeme Skennar (2011–12) : G. I. Skennar
 Brad Spanner (1991–92) : B. J. Spanner
 Derek Tate (2005–06) : D. J. Tate
 Dale Turner (1999–2000 to 2000–01) : D. A. Turner
 Daniel Vettori (2009–10) : D. L. Vettori

See also
 List of international cricketers from Queensland

References

Cricket

Queensland, First Class